Switzerland was present at the Eurovision Song Contest 1986, held in Bergen, Norway.

Before Eurovision

National final 
The Swiss national final to select their entry, Concours Eurovision '86, was held on 25 January 1986 at the Schweizer Radio DRS Studios in Zürich, and was hosted by singer Paola del Medico, who had represented Switzerland in 1969 and 1980. Five juries selected the winner: one jury each from the German, French and Italian cantons of Switzerland, one jury made up of radio, television and newspaper journalists, and one jury composed of "music experts."

The winning entry was "Pas pour moi", performed by Daniela Simmons and composed by Atilla Şereftuğ, with lyrics written by Nella Martinetti.

French, German and Italian were represented equally in the national final, with three songs in each language. One of the three German songs were sung in the Swiss German dialect, song "Lily Lilas" was sung particularly in German, particularly in French, and for the first time, Romansh was represented.

At Eurovision
Simmons performed tenth on the night of the Contest, following Spain and preceding Israel. At the close of the voting the song had received 140 points, placing 2nd in a field of 20 competing countries. It would become Switzerland's third (and final) second-placing song.

The Swiss conductor at the contest was the composer of the song, Atilla Şereftuğ.

Voting

References

External links
Swiss National Final 1986

1986
Countries in the Eurovision Song Contest 1986
Eurovision